David Tarrant (died 2018) was a New Zealand Paralympian who competed in sport shooting. At the 1980 Summer Paralympics, he won a bronze medal in the Mixed Air Pistol 2-5 event.

References

External links 
 
 

2018 deaths
New Zealand male sport shooters
Paralympic shooters of New Zealand
Shooters at the 1980 Summer Paralympics
Medalists at the 1980 Summer Paralympics
Paralympic bronze medalists for New Zealand